The 2015 Delaware State Hornets football team represented Delaware State University in the 2015 NCAA Division I FCS football season. They were led by first-year head coach Kenny Carter and played their home games at Alumni Stadium. They were a member of the Mid-Eastern Athletic Conference (MEAC). They finished the season 1–10, 1–7 in MEAC play to finish in a four-way tie for eighth place.

Schedule
*Source: Schedule

References

Delaware State
Delaware State Hornets football seasons
Delaware State Hornets football